Ihor Oleksandrovych Shcherbak (9 June 1943 – 20 November 2002) was a Ukrainian middle-distance runner who represented Soviet Union in the marathon at the 1972 Summer Olympics.

References

External links
 Ihor Shcherbak at World Athletics
 Ihor Shcherbak at ARRS database
 Ihor Shcherbak's memory page at marathon.kharkov.ua 

1943 births
Sportspeople from Poltava
Athletes (track and field) at the 1972 Summer Olympics
Ukrainian male long-distance runners
Soviet male long-distance runners
Ukrainian male marathon runners
Soviet male marathon runners
Olympic athletes of the Soviet Union
Sportspeople from Kharkiv
2002 deaths